Hilmi is a masculine Arabic given name, it may refer to:

Hilmi Esat Bayındırlı (born 1962), Turkish*American para-skier
Hilmi Güler (born 1946), Turkish politician and metallurgical engineer
Hilmi İşgüzar (born 1929), Turkish politician and former government minister
Hilmi Mihçi (born 1976), Dutch footballer of Turkish descent
Hilmi Murad (1919–1998), Egyptian economist and politician
Hilmi Özkök (born 1940), the 24th Chief of the General Staff of the Turkish Armed Forces
Hilmi Sözer (born 1970), Turkish-German actor
Hilmi Volkan Demir, Turkish scientist, best known for his works on White Light Generation
Hilmi Yarayıcı (born 1969), Turkish musician
Hilmi M. Zawati (born 1953), Palestinian jurist

 Midname
Ahmad Hilmi of Filibe (or Ahmet Hilmi) (1865–1914), well known Turkish Sufi writer and thinker
Ahmed Hilmi Abd al-Baqi (1883–1963), Palestinian politician and economist
Hüseyin Hilmi Işık (1911–2001), Turkish Sunni Islamic scholar
Hüseyin Hilmi Pasha (1855–1922), statesman and twice Grand vizier of the Ottoman Empire
Mustafa Hilmi Hadžiomerović (1816–1895), the first Mufti of Sarajevo appointed Reis-l-ulema in 1882 by the Austrian authorities
Süleyman Hilmi Tunahan, (1888–1959), Islamic erudite of the 20th century

 Surname
Mohamed Hilmi (1931–2022), Algerian actor
Rafiq Hilmi (1898–1960), Kurdish historian, writer and politician born in Kirkuk

See also
Helmi, an alternate spelling

Masculine given names
Arabic masculine given names
Turkish masculine given names